Jennifer Flackett is an American film director, film producer, screenwriter and television writer. In television, she has written for series Beverly Hills, 90210, L.A. Law and Earth 2.
As a screenwriter, she wrote on the films Madeline (1998), Wimbledon (2004), Little Manhattan (2005), Journey to the Center of the Earth (2008), and Nim's Island (2008), which she also directed.

Flackett works alongside her husband, fellow director and screenwriter Mark Levin. They are the creators of The Man's Guide To Love, which began as a successful video blog offering man-to-man advice on the subject of love. The Man's Guide To Love book will be published by Simon & Schuster, and a feature film they are directing and producing alongside Laurence Mark. Principal photography on The Man's Guide To Love movie commences in Spring 2015.

In 2016, she co-created the animated sitcom Big Mouth, with Levin, Nick Kroll, and Andrew Goldberg.

In 2014 they were writing and creating the half-hour single-camera TV shows Confusing for NBC, and The Courtship of Eddie's Father for Warner Brothers Television.

Both Flackett and Levin made their directorial debut with the film Little Manhattan, although Flackett was not formally credited for her directing work on the film, she was only credited as a writer.

Flackett grew up in Newton, Massachusetts and graduated from Wesleyan University in 1986.

Levin & Flackett recently returned from a one-year, around-the-world journey with their two children. Dubbed “A Year To Think,” they visited 38 countries and 110 cities across six continents over 365 days, during which they made 120 short films about their experiences.

Filmography

References

External links
 

Film producers from New York (state)
Screenwriters from New York (state)
American television writers
American women film directors
Living people
Skydance Media people
Writers from Newton, Massachusetts
Writers from New York City
Wesleyan University alumni
American women screenwriters
American women television writers
Year of birth missing (living people)
Film directors from New York City
Screenwriters from Massachusetts
American women film producers
Film producers from Massachusetts
20th-century American screenwriters
20th-century American women writers
21st-century American screenwriters
21st-century American women writers